Jorge Ornelas Isaac Sangumba (1944–1982) served as the Foreign Minister of UNITA during the Angolan War of Independence.

Background
Sangumba studied in the United States before joining the National Union of Angolan Students (UNEA) in the early 1960s. In 1965 he became UNEA's representative for external affairs, a precursor for his future appointment as the National Union for the Total Independence of Angola (UNITA's) Foreign Minister in August 1969.

On February 9, 1976, Sangumba had officially announced that The central Angolan city of Huambo, that where two Westernsupported nationalist movements proclaimed the establishment of a government last November, had fallen to Sovietsupplied Angolan forces led by Cuban troops.

Death and aftermath
Jonas Savimbi, leader of UNITA, allegedly ordered Sangumba's assassination along with several other potential rivals for leadership of UNITA during the Angolan Civil War.

Sangumba's family have been trying to find the reasons that led his murder, but have not found anything out. Tribute videos about him have been posted on sites such as YouTube.

See also
List of unsolved murders

References

1944 births
1980s murders in Angola
1982 crimes in Angola
1982 deaths
1982 murders in Africa
20th-century Angolan people
Angolan rebels
Angolan revolutionaries
Angolan warlords
Assassinated Angolan politicians
Members of UNITA
People of the Angolan Civil War
UNITA politicians
Unsolved murders in Angola